The Edge of the Earth is an extended play by American rock band Switchfoot, released digitally on September 9, 2014 through lowercase people/Atlantic.
It consists of previously unreleased songs from Switchfoot's rock documentary film Fading West.

The EP has debuted at number 39 on the US Billboard 200 chart, and reached top 10 positions on Billboard Christian Albums, Soundtrack Albums and Top Alternative Albums charts.

Songs
The first song on the record, "Fading West", is the only track that had been previously released, as the song was included on the physical edition of the Fading West EP, which was released in September 2013.

The second track, "Against the Voices", has been a "long-time fan favorite," as the song was first played by the band live in 2010. However, it hadn't made the cut for Switchfoot's two previous full-length albums, Vice Verses (2011) and Fading West (2014).

According to the band, the song "What It Costs" marked the first song recording for which bassist Tim Foreman provided lead vocals, replacing his brother Jon Foreman.

Track listing

Personnel

Switchfoot
 Jon Foreman – lead vocals (tracks 1–3, 5–7), rhythm guitar, lead guitar
 Tim Foreman – bass, lead vocals (track 4)
 Chad Butler – drums
 Jerome Fontamillas – keyboards, rhythm guitar
 Drew Shirley – lead guitar

Technical Personnel
 Neal Avron - production, engineering, mixing
 Tanner Sparks - engineering
 Adam Hawkins - engineering, mixing
 Eric Owyoung - mixing
 Ted Jensen - mastering

Charts

See also
Fading West (film)

References

2014 EPs
Atlantic Records EPs
Lowercase People Records EPs
Switchfoot EPs